Power Man (Victor Alvarez) is a fictional superhero appearing in American comic books published by Marvel Comics. He is the third person to use the Power Man alias after Erik Josten and Luke Cage.

Publication history
The character first appeared in Shadowland: Power Man #1, part of Marvel's 2010 "Shadowland" crossover and was created by Fred Van Lente and Mahmud Asrar. The character subsequently appeared in a spin-off mini-series, Power Man and Iron Fist, the following year. Power Man would then appear in "The Chosen", a story in the anthology comic Fear Itself: The Home Front.

Power Man appeared as a supporting character in Avengers Academy beginning with issue #21 (Jan 2012), making occasional appearances throughout the series.

Starting in September 2013, he appears as one of the lead characters in the Marvel NOW! relaunch of Mighty Avengers.

Fictional character biography
Victor Alvarez was first introduced as a teenager from the neighborhood of Hell's Kitchen in New York City. He is the son of Reina Alvarez and Shades. As a child, he was caught in an explosion caused by the villain Bullseye that resulted in the deaths of over 100 people including his father. Victor survived by somehow using a technique that drew the chi from the dead bodies around him and temporarily granted him superhuman strength and fortitude.

Some time later during the Shadowland storyline, Victor took on the name Power Man and began using his abilities to fight crime as a hero for hire, advertising his services on sites like Craigslist. Victor's activities eventually drew the attention of Luke Cage, a member of the Avengers who had once used the Power Man name. Cage and his partner Iron Fist eventually learn that Victor is the son of Shades, a Puerto Rican supervillain that Cage had fought years earlier. Though Victor dislikes both Cage and Iron Fist, he eventually teams up with them to help the other heroes fight the crazed Matt Murdock and his army of Hand ninjas.

During the Fear Itself storyline, Power Man ends up teleported onto a station in the middle of the Pacific Ocean with Amadeus Cho, Spider-Girl, Thunderstrike and X-23. They end up fighting a group of samurai Shark Men. Power Man is part of the new class of students when the Avengers Academy moves to the former headquarters of the West Coast Avengers.

During the Infinity storyline, Power Man was with Heroes for Hire while they stopped Plunderer's men from stealing robot parts. After Superior Spider-Man (Doctor Octopus' mind in Peter Parker's body) stops Plunderer, he called Heroes for Hire mercenaries in front of Power Man. While at a café with Luke Cage, Power Man expresses a desire to attack Spider-Man, Luke is more concerned with the consequences for his family. Power Man then plans to start his own version of the Avengers.

Powers and abilities
As a result of the traumatic explosion during his childhood, Power Man possesses the ability to draw chi energy from those around him and temporarily grant himself superhuman strength and fortitude. When utilizing this power, Victor's skin color changes to a glowing red. This technique is similar to the one that gives Iron Fist his abilities, something the hero commented on during his first encounter with Victor. Victor Alvarez wears a yellow and black body suit with metal embellishments, similar to the look of Luke Cage, the first (heroic) Power Man.

References

External links

 
 
 
 Power Man (Victor Alvarez) at Marvel Wiki
 Power Man (Victor Alvarez) at Comic Vine
 Powerman Biography at World of Black Heroes
 

Comics characters introduced in 2010
Characters created by Fred Van Lente
Fictional characters from New York (state)
African-American superheroes
Avengers (comics) characters
Fictional Dominican American people
Fictional Afro-Dominican people
Marvel Comics characters with superhuman strength
Marvel Comics martial artists